The Amphibolurinae are a subfamily of lizards in the family Agamidae. Members of this subfamily are found in Australia and New Guinea, although one species, the Chinese water dragon, is found in Southeast Asia.

Genera
Genera within the subfamily Amphibolurinae have evolved seth scales and usually dwell in flat, sandy habitats. This subfamily includes:

 Amphibolurus (lashtail dragons)
 Chelosania (ring-tailed dragon)
 Chlamydosaurus (frilled-neck lizard)
 Cryptagama (gravel dragon)
 Ctenophorus (comb-bearing dragons)
 Diporiphora (two-lined dragons)
 Gowidon (long-snouted lashtail, long-nosed water dragon)
 Hypsilurus (rainforest dragons)
 Intellagama (Australian water dragon) 
 Lophognathus 
 Lophosaurus (forest dragons)
 Moloch (thorny devil)
 Physignathus (Chinese water dragon)
 Pogona (bearded dragons)
 Rankinia (heath dragon)
 Tropicagama (swamplands lashtail, northern water dragon)
 Tympanocryptis (earless dragons)

Gallery

References

Agamidae
Taxa named by Johann Georg Wagler